John Charles Kunich is an adjunct professor at the Belmont Abbey College. He also taught as an adjunct professor at the University of North Carolina at Charlotte. He earned his Juris Doctor degree from Harvard Law School and a Master of Laws degree (LL.M.) in Environmental Law from George Washington University School of Law. He earned his Bachelor and Master of Science degrees from the University of Illinois. He was born and raised in Chicago. He also was a Fulbright Senior Specialist and Professor of Law at the Indian Law Institute. He has taught summer courses in China for several years at major universities in Beijing, Chengdu, Guangzhou, and Xi'an, including the University of International Business and Economics as well as Sichuan University.

John Kunich has twice testified before U.S. Congressional Committees, regarding environmental matters relating to endangered species. He has been interviewed regarding legal matters numerous times, on such networks as CNN International, PBS, Fox News, MSNBC, and WGN. He is the author of dozens of scholarly journal articles in the fields of environmental law, constitutional law, and leadership.  These pieces have been published in the law reviews of the University of Southern California, Georgetown, Washington University, and many other leading law schools, as well as The Journal of Leadership Studies.

Kunich has authored or co-authored eight books, including Yes, You're a Leader!:  A Practical Guide to Leadership for Real People;  Betting The Earth: How We Can Still Win the Biggest Gamble of All Time; Cubs Fans' Leadership Secrets;  Ark of the Broken Covenant; Entomology and the Law; Killing Our Oceans; Survival Kit for Leaders; and The Naked Clone. In addition to his environmental, legal, and leadership publications, Kunich is the composer, lyricist, and librettist of the musical play "Marva!" dealing with the famed African-American educator Marva Collins and her founding of an extraordinary inner-city school in Chicago's most desperate ghetto. He also is the creator of more than 100 original songs (both music and lyrics), dozens of which have been published by music publishers in New York City and Nashville.

Professor Kunich has participated in more than 100 presentations or debates during the last few years.  He has spoken at Oxford University, the Royal Geographical Society, the Indian Law Institute, Jinan University, and more than 75 different law schools.  His speaking events have been held at such United States law schools as Yale, Columbia, Stanford, University of Chicago, Duke, Berkeley, Georgetown, New York University, Northwestern, Vanderbilt, George Washington University, Boston University, and dozens more.

He also has participated three times in the Main Event of the World Series of Poker at the Rio in Las Vegas, Nevada.

References 

Living people
Harvard Law School alumni
George Washington University Law School alumni
University of Illinois alumni
People from Chicago
University of North Carolina at Charlotte faculty
American environmental lawyers
Year of birth missing (living people)